The Insolvency Service is an executive agency of the Department for Business, Energy and Industrial Strategy with headquarters in London. It has around 1,700 staff, operating from 22 locations across Great Britain.

The Insolvency Service administers compulsory company liquidations and personal bankruptcies and deals with misconduct through investigation of companies and enforcement. It also makes redundancy payments in cases where a company is insolvent.

Responsibilities
It is responsible for authorising and regulating the insolvency profession. They:
 administer and look into the affairs of bankrupts, people subject to debt relief orders, and liquidated companies, making reports of any directors’ misconduct
 carry out investigations into live companies
 act as trustee/liquidator where no private sector insolvency practitioner is in place
 act as nominee and supervisor in fast-track individual voluntary arrangements
 deal with the disqualification of unfit directors in all corporate failures 
 deal with bankruptcy and debt relief restrictions orders and undertakings
 advise BIS ministers and other government departments and agencies on insolvency, redundancy and related issues 
 issue redundancy payments via the National Insurance Fund 
 provide information on insolvency and redundancy matters

Working under the Insolvency Acts
The Insolvency Service operates under a statutory framework – mainly the Insolvency Act 1986, the Insolvency Act 2000, the Company Directors Disqualification Act 1986 and the Employment Rights Act 1996. Insolvency Service staff are based across the UK in a network of 38 official receiver offices throughout England and Wales;

Expansion of the Insolvency Service
On 1 April 2006, Companies Investigation Branch of BERR transferred to the service and is based in offices in both London and Manchester. The new debt relief orders which came into force on 6 April 2009 under the Tribunals, Courts and Enforcement Act 2007 are not dealt with by official receivers' offices but at the service's Plymouth office.

In April 2003, the Redundancy Payments Service transferred to the Insolvency Service. This enabled a joined-up approach to company failure and any consequential redundancies to be had and this is demonstrated on a frequent basis.

Governance
The Agency Chief Executive is the Agency Accounting Officer and is responsible for the day-to-day running of the Service. Dean Beale succeeded Sarah Albon on 4 November 2020.

The Insolvency Service Board is responsible for the long-term success of the agency. This includes:

 setting strategic aims and objectives
 making sure that leadership and resources are in place to meet these aims
 challenging and supporting management performance
 reporting to BIS

Board members
The board is made up of both executive and non-executive members.

The executive members are:

 Dean Beale, Inspector General and Chief Executive
 Alec Pybus, Chief Operating Officer
 Chris Pleass, Finance and Commercial Director
 Angela Crossley, Interim Strategy and Change Director
 Dan Goad, People and Capability Director

The non-executive members are:

 Stephen Allinson, Chair
 Alan Graham
 Richard Oirschot
 Mary Chapman
 William Trower QC

See also
Administration order
Administrative receivership
Bankruptcy
Liquidation
Protected trust deed (only available in Scotland)
Simplified individual voluntary arrangement
United States Trustee Program

References

External links
 

Executive agencies of the United Kingdom government
Bankruptcy in England and Wales
Insolvency law of the United Kingdom
Department for Business, Innovation and Skills